Jeffery W. Hammond (born January 25, 1959) is a retired United States Army officer who previously served as the commanding general of the 4th Infantry Division and commander of U.S. forces in Baghdad, Iraq.

Early life
Hammond attended the University of Southern Mississippi in Hattiesburg, receiving bachelor's and master's degrees in special education. He was a quarterback and team captain for the USM football football

Military career
Hammond was commissioned as a second lieutenant of field artillery in 1978. He was assigned to the 3rd Infantry Division in Germany, where he advanced to command of a battery. He returned to the U.S. to take the Infantry Officer Advanced Course at Fort Benning, Georgia.

From 1984 to 1987 he returned to the University of Southern Mississippi, where he served as assistant professor of military science. After that, he spent a year in South Korea.

In 1988 he was assigned to the 24th Infantry Division at Fort Stewart, Georgia. With the 1st Battalion, 41st Field Artillery of that division, Hammond was deployed to Saudi Arabia as part of Operation Desert Shield in 1990 and participated in Operation Desert Storm, the recapture of Kuwait from Iraq in 1991.

In the mid-1990s Hammond took command of the 4th Battalion, 29th Field Artillery, part of the 1st Armored Division in Germany, leading them during Operation Joint Endeavor in Bosnia-Herzegovina. Staff service in Washington, D.C. and a tour as division artillery commander of the 1st Cavalry Division followed.

Hammond served as G3 for the British-led Allied Rapid Reaction Corps followed by duty as assistant division commander (support) of the 1st Cavalry Division during Operation Iraqi Freedom in 2003 in Iraq. He later served as the Army's Director of Operations, Readiness and Mobilization before taking command of the 4th Infantry Division on 19 January 2007.

Return to Southern Miss

Hammond currently serves as the Director, Military and Veterans Student Affairs at The University of Southern Mississippi.  he is also Co-Chair of the MS Community Veterans Engagement Board.

Decorations

  Legion of Merit
  Bronze Star with two oak leaf clusters
  Defense Meritorious Service Medal
  Meritorious Service Medal with one silver oak leaf cluster
  Joint Service Commendation Medal
  Army Commendation Medal with oak leaf cluster

Notes

References

1956 births
Living people
United States Army personnel of the Iraq War
United States Army generals
Recipients of the Legion of Merit
Southern Miss Golden Eagles and Lady Eagles athletic directors
University of Southern Mississippi alumni
People from Hattiesburg, Mississippi
United States Army personnel of the Gulf War